Mr. Go is a 2013 South Korean sport-comedy film written and directed by Kim Yong-hwa based on Huh Young-man's 1984 comic The 7th Team. About a gorilla who becomes a baseball superstar and his 15-year-old female manager, it stars Xu Jiao and Sung Dong-il. Mr. Go was the first South Korean film to be fully shot in 3D. A co-production between South Korea and China, it was released simultaneously in both countries on July 17 and 18, respectively.

Plot
Young circus ringmaster Wei Wei has only bat-swinging gorilla Ling Ling to depend on as her only family member and friend, when her grandfather dies in the Great Sichuan earthquake, leaving behind an insurmountable debt. When a loan shark threatens to sell Ling Ling and the circus kids to cover the debt, Wei Wei has no choice but to allow Ling Ling to be scouted in the Korean Baseball League by the materialistic sports agent Sung. Ling Ling, now dubbed "Mr. Go," becomes an instant hit with fans and leads his team Doosan Bears to a miraculous winning streak.

Cast

 Xu Jiao as Zhao Wei Wei
 Sung Dong-il as Seong Chung-su
 Joe Odagiri as Ito Hiroshi, owner of Chunichi Dragons
 Kim Hee-won as Lin Xiaogang, loan shark
 Kim Kang-woo as Kim, Doosan Bears general manager
 Kim Jung-tae as NC Dinos general manager
 Kim Eung-soo as Jin Yoon-tae, Korea Baseball Organization commissioner
 Jung In-gi as Gong In-gu, KBO secretary-general
 Jo Jae-yoon  as Orthopedic doctor
 Kim Heung-rae as Ling Ling/Mr. Go
 Lee Jun-hyeok as Leiting/Zeroz
 Kim Bo-yoon as Sunny
 Kim Gi-cheon as Circus manager
 Kim Go-eun as Xiuni/Sunny, circus orphan
 Kim Ye-won as Zhuni/Junny, circus orphan
 Kim Hong-su as Lin Xiaogang's henchman
 Shin Se-yong as Bamboo tube man
 Na Ju-ho as Fan signal man
 Tamura Hiroto as Inoue Daichi, owner of Yomiuri Giants 
 Kim Jeong-seok as Doosan Bears director
 Seong Mun-su as NC Dinos director
 Kim Ji-young as young Weiwei
 Jesse Day as Frederic Pearl, Primate Protection Association representative
 Yun Yuk as Sports commentator
 Kim Hak-ryeong as Sports commentator
 Yu Seung-ho as Sportscaster
 Lee Jae-ho as Sportscaster
 Kim In-woo as Lotte Giants general manager
 Song Min-soo as NC Dinos coach
 Cha Jong-ho as Gang member
 Kim Tae-joon as Judge
 Kim In-cheol as Judge
 Ham Jin-seong as Doosan Bears bench member
 Byun Hee-bong as Weiwei's grandfather
 Han Joon-woo as Reporter
 Ma Dong-seok as Baseball commentator 
 Jung Ji-yoon as herself, home-shopping show host
 Kim Jung-eun as herself, TV musical show MC
 Shin-Soo Choo as himself, baseball player
 Hyun-jin Ryu as himself, baseball player
 Kim Sung-joo as himself

Production
Kim Yong-hwa, director of box-office hits 200 Pounds Beauty (2006) and Take Off (2009), decided to adapt Huh Young-man's 28-year-old comic after seeing the YouTube video of Christian the lion, which demonstrated that humans are capable of taming animals. But for the film to work, the gorilla had to look like a living creature. Kim decided to shoot entirely in 3D, and of the 2,000 shots in the film, 1,000 are special effects shots of the gorilla Ling Ling. For four years, a team of more than 500 animators and CG professionals led by visual effects director Jeong Seong-jin developed motion capture technology, facial motion capture technology and a digital fur production program to make the gorilla as realistic as possible, followed by another year of editing. The images were so precise and delicate that all the 3.8 million hairs on Ling Ling could sway with the wind.

With consultant Kim Tae-yong of Rhythm and Hues Studios (famous for its work on Life of Pi), the production team established a new company Dexter Studios (with 180 employees), which created the software Zelos System to process large amounts of data efficiently so that the film cost 10 percent of the budget demanded by most Hollywood movies. It also received  from the International Co-Production Incentive Support 2013, a project run by the Korean Film Council (KOFIC), and director Kim spent  from his own pocket.

Music
The movie's theme song "Bye" was sung by Kim Tae-yeon, a member of Girls' Generation. Composed by music director Lee Jae-hak, "Bye" had a Korean version and a Chinese version. The score was recorded by the Hollywood Symphony Orchestra at Sony Pictures' Scoring Stage in Los Angeles, CA.

Release
The film opened on 1,000 screens in South Korea on July 17, 2013, and on 5,000 screens (all in 3D) in China on July 18. It was also released in other Asian countries, namely Singapore on July 25, Malaysia and Thailand on August 1, Indonesia on August 6, Taiwan on August 9, Hong Kong on August 15, and the Philippines on October 16.

Box office
Due to competition with other summer blockbusters such as The Wolverine, Snowpiercer and The Terror Live, Mr. Go had a disappointing box-office performance on its opening weekend in South Korea, drawing 540,411 moviegoers at 788 screens. It grossed a total of  domestically on 1,325,039 tickets sold.

In China, the film topped the box office on its opening day, earning , which is the highest single-day record for a Korean film in the country.

Awards and nominations

References

External links
  
 
 
 

2013 films
2010s sports comedy films
South Korean 3D films
Chinese 3D films
South Korean multilingual films
Chinese multilingual films
Films about gorillas
Films based on works by Huh Young-man
South Korean baseball films
2013 3D films
Films directed by Kim Yong-hwa
Live-action films based on comics
Chinese baseball films
South Korean sports comedy films
2013 multilingual films
2013 comedy films
Chinese sports comedy films
2010s South Korean films